Campbellton station is located on Roseberry Street near the end of Shannon Street in the city of Campbellton, New Brunswick, Canada. The station is staffed and is wheelchair-accessible. Campbellton is served by Via Rail's Montreal-Halifax train, the Ocean.

External links

 Via Rail page for the Ocean

Buildings and structures in Restigouche County, New Brunswick
Rail transport in Campbellton, New Brunswick
Via Rail stations in New Brunswick